The following is a list of Michigan State Historic Sites in Gratiot County, Michigan. Sites marked with a dagger (†) are also listed on the National Register of Historic Places in Gratiot County, Michigan.


Current listings

See also
 National Register of Historic Places listings in Gratiot County, Michigan

Sources
 Historic Sites Online – Gratiot County. Michigan State Housing Developmental Authority. Accessed January 23, 2011.

References

Gratiot County
State Historic Sites
Tourist attractions in Gratiot County, Michigan